Vepris heterophylla is a species of plant in the family Rutaceae. It is found in Burkina Faso, Cameroon, Ghana, and Mali. It is threatened by habitat loss.

References

External links

het
Flora of West Tropical Africa
Endangered flora of Africa
Taxonomy articles created by Polbot